Badminton at the 2019 Pacific Games in Apia, Samoa was held on 8–13 July 2019. The tournament included men's, women's and mixed events, and was played at the Faleata Sports Complex in Tuanaimato. The Northern Marianas badminton team competed at the Pacific Games for the first time in this 2019 tournament.

Teams
The nations competing were:

Results

Mixed Teams

Medal summary

Medal table

Medalists

References

External links
Tournament result at www.tournamentsoftware.com
Other results - full results for other levels

2019 Pacific Games
Pacific Games
2019